Elettra de Col (born 8 December 1987) is an Italian curler.

De Col started curling in 2000. She plays in second position and is right-handed.

References

External links

1987 births
Living people
Italian female curlers
Competitors at the 2007 Winter Universiade